Stan Getz and the Cool Sounds is an album by saxophonist Stan Getz recorded at five sessions between 1953 and 1955 which was released on the Verve label in 1957.

Reception
The Allmusic review by Ken Dryden awarded the album 4 stars.

Track listing
 "Of Thee I Sing" (George Gershwin, Ira Gershwin) - 4:07
 "A Handful of Stars" (Jack Lawrence) - 3:17
 "Love Is Here to Stay" (George Gershwin, Ira Gershwin) - 3:22
 "Serenade in Blue" (Harry Warren, Mack Gordon) - 3:51
 "Flamingo" (Ted Grouya, Edmund Anderson) - 7:30
 "Blue Bells" (Phil Sunkel) - 7:09
 "Roundup Time" (Sunkel) - 7:05
 "Nobody Else But Me" (Jerome Kern, Oscar Hammerstein II) - 3:33
 "Down by the Sycamore Tree" (Traditional) - 3:02
 "Rustic Hop" (Bob Brookmeyer) - 3:45
Recorded in New York City on April 16, 1953 (track 10) and January 31, 1955 (tracks 6 & 7), and in Los Angeles, California on January 23, 1954 (tracks 8 & 9) and November 9, 1954 (track 5) and at Radio Recorders, Los Angeles, California on August 19, 1955 (tracks 1–4).

Personnel 
Stan Getz - tenor saxophone
Tony Fruscella - trumpet (tracks 6 & 7)
Bob Brookmeyer - valve trombone (tracks 5 & 10)  
Lou Levy (tracks 1–4), Jimmy Rowles (tracks 8,9), John Williams (tracks 5,6,7 & 10) - piano
Bill Anthony (tracks 5–7), Bill Crow (track 10), Leroy Vinnegar (tracks 1–4), Bob Whitlock (tracks 8 & 9) - bass
Frank Isola (tracks 5–7), Al Levitt (track 10), Shelly Manne (tracks 1–4), Max Roach (tracks 8 & 9) - drums

References 

1957 albums
Stan Getz albums
Verve Records albums
Albums produced by Norman Granz